Fran Hitchcock (born 2 December 1960 in Dublin) is an Irish former footballer who played as a forward during the 1980s and 1990s.

Hitchcock made his League of Ireland debut for Shelbourne F.C. on 7 September 1980.
He can count Home Farm F.C. (4 spells), Shamrock Rovers, Sligo Rovers, Dundalk and Bohemian F.C. amongst his many clubs during a long career in the League of Ireland.

Hitchcock scored for Athlone Town A.F.C. in the 1983–84 European Cup.

He played twice in the European Cup for Rovers in 1985 making a total of 8 appearances whilst at Glenmalure Park.

Hitchcock bought out his contract at Rovers in January 1986 to move back to Home Farm. He also played in goal for St Pats reserves.

He signed for Bohemians in October 1991.

Honours
Bohemians
 FAI Cup: 1992

Athlone Town
 League of Ireland First Division: 1987/88
 Leinster Senior Cup: 1987/88

References

External links
 

Living people
1960 births
Association football forwards
Republic of Ireland association footballers
Republic of Ireland expatriate association footballers
Association footballers from Dublin (city)
League of Ireland players
Shelbourne F.C. players
Home Farm F.C. players
Athlone Town A.F.C. players
Shamrock Rovers F.C. players
Longford Town F.C. players
St Patrick's Athletic F.C. players
Dundalk F.C. players
Sligo Rovers F.C. players
Bohemian F.C. players
Limerick F.C. players
St Francis F.C. players
Monaghan United F.C. players
Cliftonville F.C. players
SC Cambuur players
NIFL Premiership players
Eredivisie players
Irish expatriate sportspeople in the Netherlands